Jimmie's Chicken Shack is an American alternative rock band from Annapolis, Maryland. They are best known for their single "High". In 1996 they Signed to Elton John's Rocket Records and released two major-label albums, Pushing the Salmanilla Envelope and Bring Your Own Stereo. Both LPs enjoyed minor chart, radio, and MTV success and produced their best known hits "High" and "Do Right." After years of squabbling with their label and finally being set free from their contract, the band subsequently released two more albums independently, Re.Present and Fail on Cue.

History

Early years (1993–1996) 
Chicken Scratch was recorded by Mark Strazza at Hound Sound in Baltimore in 1993 after the band being together for 6 months for $600. It was only released on cassette.
Spit Burger Lottery was recorded by Mike Forjione at The Mansion in Annapolis in 1994 for $400. It was only released on cassette.
2 For 1 was released on CD in 1995. The band took both cassettes and released them on their first cd. They swapped the order so that Spit Burger Lottery started the CD first then Chicken Scratch. Jimi created the album art on a photocopy machine at Office Depot. Giving Something Back was a live record recorded at multiple venues in and around Baltimore including Hammerjacks, Graffitis and 8X10. It was recorded by their soundman at the time Jamie Rephann who would later Join 311, Jane's Addiction, ZZ Top and many others. It was released at a sold out show at Hammerjacks in Baltimore. It was released on Fowl Records Which was started by Jimi Haha.

Rocket/Island years (1996–2004) 
Singles from ...Pushing the Salmanilla Envelope were "High," "Dropping Anchor," "Blood," and "Another Day." "High" and "Dropping Anchor" both have music videos. The video for "High" was shown on MTV's 120 Minutes. Many of the songs that were included on PTSE were included on previous independent releases. It was produced by Steven Haigler and mixed by Tom Lord-Alge. High went to #10 on the Active Rock chart in Billboard Magazine. It was released on Rocket Records which was started by Elton John and a subsidiary of Universal. Bring Your Own Stereo was released by Island/Defjam in 1999. The time between the two major releases was a troubled time for the band internally. There were several changes of members and also trouble with the major label as they were shunted from Rocket/Island to Rocket/A&M then back to Rocket/Island and after the sale of Polygram to Universal Music Group, they were moved onto Island Defjam. "Do Right", "Trash" and "Lazy Boy Dash" were singles released from B.Y.O.S. "Do Right" was the first single released and the only JCS music video to make it onto MTV's Total Request Live with Carson Daly. "Trash" never received much airplay but was played live on music show on the USA Network.  A promo single of "Lazy Boy Dash" was released when it was featured in the 2000 movie The In Crowd.  "Ooh" was featured in the 2000 movie Pay It Forward. It was Produced by Jim Wirt and mixed by Tom Lord-Alge, Chris Lord-Alge and David Leonard. The video for Do Right aired as Buzzworthy on TRL and other shows on MTV. Do Right went to #8 on the Alternative chart in Billboard. With early releases of B.Y.O.S, there was a card to mail to Fowl Records for a free copy of the Slow Change EP. This EP is rare, but can still be occasionally found. The tour for these albums was with bands such as 311, Live, Everclear, Creed, Fuel, Finger Eleven, and Joydrop. Self, Earth To Andy, Sumack and many others. In January 2000, the band was chosen as openers for 311 for a 27-show tour, spanning from February 21 to March 29, with Jimmie's Chicken Shack as the sole opening act (including one special guest appearance by Incubus at a Winston-Salem show).

Koch Records (2004–2008) 
After fighting for nearly three years to get liberated from Island DefJam, they released re.present on Koch Records in April 2004. "Falling Out" (featuring Aaron Lewis of Staind) was the only single released from re.present. A music video was made for the single and received limited airplay through various outlets. This album was recorded by Frank Marchand and mixed at Waterford Digital in Severn Maryland. It was released on Koch Records. Fail On Cue was released in January 2008 on Fowl Records.  Some of the new songs on the album are "Mutha Luvas," "The Quiet Ones," "Another Great Idea," and "Making Babies." The album also included the band's second studio recorded cover of a song, Fugazi's "Waiting Room". This record was recorded by Jerome Maffeo in Jerome and Christian's house in Catonsville Maryland. It was released on Fowl Records.

Solo projects (1992–current) 
Jimi Haha started a band in 2002 called Jarflys. They put out a record called Anonymous. They continue to play in Annapolis. They have never had a band practice. The band is Jimi on guitar and vocals, Bryan Ewald on guitar, Noel White (Aidan Ewald currently) on drums and Larry Melton on bass. It was released on Fowl Records. Jimi Haha put out his first solo cd under the name Mend The Hollow in December 2016. The record was produced by Jim Wirt who produced J.C.S.'s Bring Your Own Stereo and was mixed by Tom Lord-Alge and mastered by Robert Ludwig. All of the odd numbered songs were recorded live in a few hours by the members of Jarflys. The even numbered songs were tracked with Gingerwolf on lap steel, Dominic Fragman on drums and Jim Wirt on bass and keyboards.
www.mendthehollow.com It was released on Fowl Records.

Reunion (2021–current) 

When playing live the band will be performing as a 5-piece but will continue on as a 4-piece on dates that Island has overlapping shows with his other band, CandleBox.
"2econds" is the bands most recent studio record. Featured players are Jerome Maffeo, Christian Valiente, Island Styles and the record reintroduced Matt Jones, after playing with the band Cowboy Mouth from New Orleans for several years. The album was produced by Jim Wirt at Superior Sound in Cleveland Ohio. The LP was released October 25, 2022 under the Fowl Records name.

Members

Discography

Studio albums 
Pushing the Salmanilla Envelope (1997)
Bring Your Own Stereo (1999)
Re.present (2004)
Fail on Cue (2008)
2econds (2022)

Independent albums 
Chicken Scratch (1993)
Spit Burger Lottery (1994)

Live albums 
Giving Something Back (1995)

Compilation albums 
2 for 1 Special (1995) [combination album containing both independent albums "Chicken Scratch" & "Spit Burger Lottery"]

Extended plays 
The Bongjam EP (1998)
Slow Change EP (1999)

Singles

References

External links 
jimi haha's artwork
Jimmie's Chicken Shack Official Website
Jimmie's Chicken Shack collection at the Internet Archive's live music archive
Interview with Jimi Haha by Greg Szeto of Bmore Live
Jim McD's 3D Animation

Alternative rock groups from Maryland
American funk metal musical groups
American post-grunge musical groups
Musical groups established in 1993
Musical quartets
1993 establishments in Maryland